These are the Oricon number one albums of 2002, per the Oricon Albums Chart.

Chart history

Trivia
 Number-one album of 2002: Deep River by Hikaru Utada.
 Most weeks at number-one: Misia with a total of 4 weeks.

External links
https://web.archive.org/web/20141021000023/http://www.geocities.jp/object_ori/indexa.html

See also
2002 in music

2002 record charts
Lists of number-one albums in Japan
2002 in Japanese music